The Motorola Flipout (Model Number MB511, also styled FLIPOUT) is a phone made by Motorola and released in June 2010. Its touchscreen is 2.8 inches in size. It also has a 3.2-megapixel camera and comes in a wide variety of colors such as "Poppy Red", "Brilliant Blue″, "Licorice Black", "White", and "Saffron". However, in Australia, only "Poppy Red" and "Licorice Black" are available. The Flipout runs on Android 2.1 (codenamed Eclair). Its square-shaped body has two parts that rotate near the bottom-right corner to reveal a five-row QWERTY keyboard below the screen. It has an accelerometer and includes a web browser with Adobe Flash Lite 3.0. It also has a 720 MHz processor with a QVGA 320x240 pixel display.

General features 
 The phone is built on Android 2.1, and features Motoblur, which integrates multiple social network service sites on the homescreen.

Specifications 
The Flipout replaces the bigger Backflip. The specifications according to the Motorola website as of October 2010 are:
 Model MB511
 Screen size: 3.1-in.
 Screen resolution: QVGA (320 x 240 pixels)
 Weight: 4.2 oz (120 g)
 Size: 53.0 × 108.0 × 15.3 mm
 Input devices: QWERTY keyboard, touchscreen
 Battery: 1170 mAh Lithium-Ion 3.7 V Motorola BT60
 Processor: 720 mHz 
 RAM: 512 MB
 ROM: 512 MB
 Memory: up to 32 GB microSD
 Wi-FI: 802.11b/g
 Bluetooth: 2.1 + EDR and A2DP
 GPS receiver, accelerometer
 Dual microphone with noise cancellation
 3.1 megapixels

Applications 
Users may customize the phone by installing apps through the Android Market; however, some carriers (AT&T) do not give users the option to install non-market apps onto the Flipout (a policy they have continued with all of their Android phones and which was already in effect with the Backflip). Users can circumvent this limitation by manually installing 3rd party apps using the tools included with the SDK while the device is connected to a desktop.

System upgrades

Android 2.3 
Since Motorola won't provide further updates for the Flipout, CyanogenMod 7.2 (Android 2.3.7) is used to update the device beyond official releases. Work was carried out at Xda-developers to update the Flipout to Android Gingerbread.

Root access 
The Flipout was successfully "rooted" (manipulated to provide Superuser access). This allowed installing and launching custom software, and root access on the phone using a Terminal emulator. Later on, the Flipout was rooted using APK applications such as Superuser Permissions.

Gallery

See also 
 List of Android devices
 Motorola

References

Android (operating system) devices
Mobile phones introduced in 2010
Linux-based devices
Motorola smartphones
Discontinued smartphones